Tiger by the Tail and Other Science Fiction Stories is the first collection of short works by Alan E. Nourse, issued in hardcover by publisher Donald McKay in 1961. It was reprinted in paperback by MacFadden Books in 1964 and 1968.  A British hardcover edition was published by Dennis Dobson in 1962, with a paperback reprint, retitled Beyond Infinity, following from Corgi Books in 1964.

Contents
 "Tiger by the Tail" (Galaxy 1951)
 "Nightmare Brother" (Astounding 1953)
 "PRoblem" (Galaxy 1956)
 "The Coffin Cure" (Galaxy 1957)
 "Brightside Crossing" (Galaxy 1956)
 "The Native Soil" (Fantastic Universe 1957)
 "Love Thy Vimp" (F&SF 1952)
 "Letter of the Law" (If 1954)
 "Family Resemblance" (Astounding 1953)

Reception
Galaxy reviewer Floyd C. Gale rated the collection 4.5 stars out of five, declaring that "all nine of the stories rate fine to excellent and would be standouts in any company."

References

External links
 
 

1961 short story collections
Science fiction anthologies